The National Film Award for Best Actress (officially known as the Rajat Kamal Award for the Best Actress) is an honour presented annually at the National Film Awards of India since 1968 to an actress for the best performance in a leading role within the Indian film industry. The National Film Awards were called the "State Awards for Films" when established in 1954. The State Awards instituted the "Best Actress" category in 1968 as the "Urvashi Award for the Best Actress"; in 1975, the "Urvashi Award" was renamed as the "Rajat Kamal Award for the Best Actress". Throughout the years, accounting for ties and repeat winners, the Government of India has presented a total of 56 Best Actress awards to 45 different actresses.

Although the Indian film industry produces films in more than 20 languages and dialects, the actresses whose performances have won awards have worked in ten major languages: Hindi (22 awards), Tamil (7 awards), Bengali (6 awards), Malayalam (6 awards), Telugu (4 awards), Kannada (3 awards), English (3 awards), Marathi (2 awards), Assamese (one award) and Urdu (one award).

The first recipient was Nargis Dutt from Bollywood, who was honoured at the 15th National Film Awards (1967) for her performance in Raat Aur Din. The actress who won the most Rajat Kamal awards is Shabana Azmi with five wins, followed by Sharada and Kangana Ranaut with three wins. As of 2021, four actresses—Smita Patil, Archana, Shobana, and Tabu who have won the award two times. Sharada, Archana and Shobana are the only three actresses to get the award for performing in two different languages. Sharada was bestowed with the awards for her performances in two Malayalam films: Thulabharam and Swayamvaram in 1968 and 1972 respectively, and in 1978 for the Telugu film Nimajjanam. Archana was first honoured in 1987 for the Tamil film Veedu and was awarded for the second time in 1988 for the Telugu film Daasi. Shobana received her first award for the Malayalam film Manichitrathazhu in 1993, and her second for the English film Mitr, My Friend in 2001. As of 2020, the late Monisha Unni remains the youngest recipient of the honour; she was awarded for the Malayalam film Nakhakshathangal in 1986 when she was 16. Indrani Haldar and Rituparna Sengupta are the only two actresses to be honoured for the same film—Dahan. Kangana Ranaut is the only actress to be honoured for her performance in two different films (Manikarnika: The Queen of Jhansi and Panga) in the same year. Sridevi is the only actress who was honoured posthumously for her performance in Mom (2017). The most recent recipient is Aparna Balamurali, who will be honoured at the 68th National Film Awards for her performance in the 2020 Tamil language film, Soorarai Pottru.

Key

Multiple winners 
 5 Wins: Shabana Azmi
 3 wins: Sharada, Kangana Ranaut
 2 Wins: Smita Patil, Archana, Shobana and Tabu

Recipients

See also 

 List of Indian film actresses

Notes

References

External links 
 Official Page for Directorate of Film Festivals, India
 National Film Awards Archives

Film awards for lead actress
Actress